The Margate City Schools are a community public school district that serves students in kindergarten through eighth grade from Margate City, in Atlantic County, New Jersey, United States. Students from Longport Borough, a non-operating school district, jointly attend the district's schools.

As of the 2018–19 school year, the district, comprising two schools, had an enrollment of 351 students and 48.8 classroom teachers (on an FTE basis), for a student–teacher ratio of 7.2:1.

The district is classified by the New Jersey Department of Education as being in District Factor Group "DE", the fifth-highest of eight groupings. District Factor Groups organize districts statewide to allow comparison by common socioeconomic characteristics of the local districts. From lowest socioeconomic status to highest, the categories are A, B, CD, DE, FG, GH, I and J.

For ninth through twelfth grades, public school students from Margate attend Atlantic City High School in Atlantic City, which also serves students from Brigantine and Ventnor City who attend the school as part of sending/receiving relationships. As of the 2018–19 school year, the high school had an enrollment of 1,796 students and 153.0 classroom teachers (on an FTE basis), for a student–teacher ratio of 11.7:1.

Awards and recognition
Eugene A. Tighe Middle School was one of nine public schools recognized in 2017 as Blue Ribbon Schools by the United States Department of Education.

Schools
Schools in the district (with 2018–19 enrollment data from the National Center for Education Statistics) are:
Elementary school
William H. Ross III Elementary School 169 students in grades K-4
Audrey Becker, Principal
Middle school
Eugene A. Tighe Middle School with 181 students in grades 5-8
Ryan Gaskill, Principal

Administration
Core members of the district's administration are:
Dr. Thomas Baruffi, Superintendent of Schools
Jennifer Germana, Board Secretary and School Business Administrator

Board of education
The district's board of education, with nine members, sets policy and oversees the fiscal and educational operation of the district through its administration. As a Type I school district, the board's trustees are appointed by the mayor with three seats up for reappointment each year.

References

External links
Margate City Schools

School Data for the Margate City Schools, National Center for Education Statistics
Atlantic City High School

Margate City, New Jersey
New Jersey District Factor Group DE
School districts in Atlantic County, New Jersey